Surendra Prasad Pandey is a Nepalese politician, belonging to the Nepal Communist Party currently serving as the member of the 1st Federal Parliament of Nepal. In the 2017 Nepalese general election he was elected from the Chitwan 1 constituency, securing 51080 (58.11%)  votes.

References

Nepal MPs 2017–2022
Living people
Members of the National Assembly (Nepal)
Members of the 1st Nepalese Constituent Assembly
Members of the 2nd Nepalese Constituent Assembly
Communist Party of Nepal (Unified Marxist–Leninist) politicians
1958 births